Hemipogon is the scientific name of two genera of organisms and may refer to:

Hemipogon (moth), a genus of moths in the family Geometridae, now considered synonymous with the genus Idaea
Hemipogon (plant), a genus of plants in the family Apocynaceae